Paracolpenteron hubbsii is a species of dactylogyrid Monogenean. It is the single species of the genus Paracolpenteron. It is a parasite of the urinary bladder of the maya needlefish Strongylura hubbsi (Belonidae).

According to Mendoza-Franco, Caspeta-Mandujano and Ramírez-Martínez, it differs from other dactylogyrid species without a haptoral anchor/bar complex infecting the urinary systems, gills and nasal cavities by the general morphology of hooks, a dextral vaginal opening, and details of the male copulatory organ.

The species was found on fish collected in the Rio Lacantún basin in the Montes Azules Biosphere Reserve, Chiapas, Mexico.

References

Dactylogyridae
Animals described in 2018
Fauna of Mexico
Fauna without expected TNC conservation status